Alvito may refer to:

Places

Italy
 Alvito, Lazio, a comune in the Province of Frosinone
 Duchy of Alvito, a fiefdom in the Kingdom of Naples, now part of Lazio

Portugal
 Alvito, Portugal, a municipio in Beja District, Alentejo
 Alvito da Beira
 Alvito Parish, Portugal
 Alvito River, Portugal